Scott Jarvis (born 1966) is an American linguist. He is a professor of Linguistics at the University of Utah, United States. His research focuses on second language acquisition more broadly, with a special focus on lexical diversity.

Career 
Jarvis obtained his Bachelor of Arts degree in linguistics at Brigham Young University in 1991. He obtained a Master of Arts degree in applied linguistics at Indiana University in 1993. In 1997 he was awarded with the Doctor of Philosophy degree in linguistics at Indiana University.

Between 2001 and 2002 he was the Chair of the Research Interest Section for TESOL.

Jarvis was an associate hournal editor between 2007 and 2011, a board member and associate executive director between 2011 and 2015 and has been executive editor for Language Learning.

He was the Executive Committee Member for American Association for Applied Linguistics between 2014 and 2016.

Research
Jarvis is noted for his contribution on lexical diversity. He claimed that lexical diversity should viewed as an umbrella term similarly to ecological diversity. According to Jarvis's model, lexical diversity includes variability, volume, evenness, rarity, dispersion and disparity.

Bibliography

Books
Scott, J. & Pavlenko, A. (2008). Crosslinguistic influence in language and cognition. New York: Routledge.

Articles
Jarvis, S. (2000), Methodological Rigor in the Study of Transfer: Identifying L1 Influence in them Interlanguage Lexicon. Language Learning, 50(2), 245-309. doi: 
Jarvis, S., & Odlin, T. (2000). Morphological type, spatial reference, and language transfer. Studies in Second Language Acquisition, 22(4), 535-556. doi: 
Pavlenko, A., & Jarvis, S. (2002). Bidirectional Transfer. Applied Linguistics, 23(2), 190–214, doi: 
Jarvis, S. (2002). Short texts, best-fitting curves and new measures of lexical diversity. Language Testing, 19(1), 57–84. doi: 
McCarthy, P., & Jarvis, S. (2010). MTLD, vocd-D, and HD-D: A validation study of sophisticated approaches to lexical diversity assessment. Behavior Research Methods, 42(2), 381-392.

Personal life
Jarvis married Sirpa, originally from Finland, in 1990 and they had four children. Jarvis's native language is English. However, he has learned Finnish, Swedish, Estonian, and German.

References

External links 
 

1949 births
Living people
Applied linguists
Linguists from the United States
Indiana University alumni
University of Utah faculty